Ajaysar is a village in Ajmer tehsil of Ajmer district of Rajasthan state in India. It is situated in the rural region of Ajmer division at an elevation of 466 meters above sea level.

Demographic
Per the Census of 2011 by the Government of India "091603" is the location code number of the village. The village covers 925.80 hectares of area in which 522 households are located. The total population of the village is 2790. There are 1458 are males and 1332 are females. The population in the age group of 0-6 is 576, of which 334 are males and 242 are females. The total schedule caste persons in the village are 103 with only 1 schedule tribe.

Education
The following are the schools present in the village:
 Gurukul Vidya Mandir Ajaysar School
 G.P. School Parlavas
 G. Sr. Sec. School Ajaysar
 Amity public school foysagar road, kharekhari
 Maa guru karipa public school foysagar road Kazipura
 Kandriya vidhalay -2 CRPF GC-2 foysagar road
There are a total of 1241 literates in the village whereas 1549 inhabitants are illiterate.

Geography
The people of the village speak Rajasthani, Hindi and Urdu here. The PIN code of Ajaysar is 305005. The telephone code of the village is 0145. The geographical coordinates i.e. latitude and longitude of Ajaysar are 26.4233354 and 74.622472.

Transport infrastructure
The nearest railway station is Ajmer Jn and Ajmer bus stand, which is 10.8 and 11.5 kilometres away from the village. The nearest airport is the Kishangarh Airport Ajmer, which is located 34.8 kilometres away from the village. Local transport via public buses is available within the village.

Nearby villages
The surrounding villages are -

 Kharekhari
 Hathi Khera
 Pushkar
 Ganahera
 Banseli
 Deo Nagar
 khera
 kazipura
 somalpur
 aamba
 Masiniya
 Bhanwta
 Budhwara

References

Villages in Ajmer district